Brunei is divided into four districts (daerah), namely Brunei Muara, Belait, Tutong and Temburong. Each district is divided into several mukims. Altogether there are 39 mukims in Brunei. Each mukim encompasses several villages (kampung or kampong). The following is a list of villages in Brunei.

Belait District

Melilas Mukim 

 Kampong Tempinak
 Kampong Melilas
 Kampong Bengerang II

Seria Mukim 

 Kampong Baru
 Kampong Perakong
 Kampong Jabang
 Kampong Lorong Tiga Selatan
 Kampong Panaga
 Kampong Anduki
 Kampong Sungai Bera
 Kampong Perpindahan Baru

In the Badas area:

 Kampong Badas

Sukang Mukim 

 Kampong Apak-Apak
 Kampong Saud
 Kampong Buau
 Kampong Kukup
 Kampong Sukang
 Kampong Dungun
 Kampong Ambawang
 Kampong Biadong Tengah
 Kampong Biadong Ulu

Liang Mukim 

 Andulau Forest Reserve
 Agis-Agis
 Keluyoh
 Lilas
 Lumut
 Lumut Camp
 Lumut National Housing Area 1
 Lumut National Housing Area 2
 Lumut Tersusun
 Perumpong
 Sungai Bakong
 Sungai Gana
 Sungai Kang
 Sungai Kuru
 Sungai Lalit
 Sungai Liang
 Sungai Tali
 Sungai Taring
 Skim Tanah Kurnia Rakyat Jati Lumut
 Tunggulian

Labi Mukim 

 Kampong Bukit Puan
 Kampong Gatas
 Kampong Kenapol
 Kampong Labi
 Kampong Labi Lama
 Kampong Malayan
 Kampong Mendaram Besar
 Kampong Mendaram Kecil
 Kampong Pesilin
 Kampong Rampayoh
 Kampong Ratan
 Kampong Simpang Tiga
 Kampong Sungai Petai
 Kampong Tanajor
 Kampong Tapang Lupak
 Kampong Teraja
 Kampong Terawan
 Kampong Terunan

Kuala Belait Mukim 

 Kampong Pekan Belait
 Kampong Melayu Asli
 Kampong Melayu Baru
 Kampong China
 Kampong Temenggong
 Kampong Lubok Palam
 Kampong Sungai
 Pekan Kuala Belait

Kuala Balai 

 Kampong Kuala Balai
 Kampong Mala’as
 Kampong Sungai Damit
 Kampong Sungai Besar
 Kampong Sungai Mendaram

Brunei Muara District

Berakas A 

 Anggerek Desa
 Burong Pingai Berakas
 Jaya Bakti
 Jaya Setia
 Lambak 'A'
 Lambak 'B'
 Lambak Kiri
 Lambak Kiri Landless Indigenous Citizens' Housing Scheme
 Orang Kaya Besar Imas
 Pancha Delima
 Pengiran Siraja Muda Delima Satu
 Pulaie
 Serusop

Berakas B 

 Madang
 Manggis
 Salambigar
 Sungai Akar
 Sungai Hanching
 Sungai Orok
 Sungai Tilong

Burong Pingai Ayer Mukim 

 Kampong Burong Pingai Ayer
 Kampong Lurong Dalam
 Kampong Pandai Besi 'A'
 Kampong Pandai Besi 'B'
 Kampong Sungai Pandan 'A'
 Kampong Sungai Pandan 'B
 Kampong Pg. Setia Negara
 Kampong Pekan Lama
 Kampong Sungai Asam

Gadong A Mukim 

 Katok
 Rimba
 Rimba Landless Indigenous Citizens' Housing Scheme
 Rimba National Housing Scheme Area 1
 Rimba National Housing Scheme Area 2
 Rimba National Housing Scheme Area 3
 Rimba National Housing Scheme Area 4
 Rimba National Housing Scheme Area 5
 Tungku
 Tungku Landless Indigenous Citizens' Housing Scheme Area 1
 Tungku Landless Indigenous Citizens' Housing Scheme Area 2
 Tungku Landless Indigenous Citizens' Housing Scheme Area 3 (also known as Katok 'A')

Gadong B Mukim 

 Beribi
 Kiarong
 Kiulap
 Mata-Mata
 Mata-Mata Landless Indigenous Citizens' Housing Scheme Area 1
 Mata-Mata Landless Indigenous Citizens' Housing Scheme Area 2
 Mata-Mata Landless Indigenous Citizens' Housing Scheme Area 3
 Menglait
 Pengkalan Gadong
 Perpindahan Mata-Mata

Kianggeh Mukim 

 City Centre,
 Berangan,
 Kianggeh,
 Kumbang Pasang,
 Parit,
 Pusar Ulak,
 Tasek Lama,
 Tumasek
 Tungkadeh

Kilanas Mukim 

 Bengkurong
 Bunut
 Bunut Perpindahan
 Burong Lepas
 Kilanas
 Jangsak
 Madewa
 Sinarubai
 Tanjong Bunut
 Tasek Meradun
 Telanai

Kota Batu Mukim 

 Belimbing
 Dato Gandi
 Kota Batu
 Mengkubau
 Menunggol
 Pelambayan
 Pintu Malim
 Pudak
 Pulau Baru-Baru dan Berbunut
 Riong
 Serdang
 Subok
 Sungai Belukut
 Sungai Besar
 Sungai Bunga
 Sungai Lampai
 Sungai Matan
 Perpindahan Tanjong Cendana

Lumapas Mukim 

 Kupang
 Putat
 Pengkalan Batang
 Kasat
 Buang Sakar
 Tarap Bau
 Bukit Merikan
 Lupak Luas
 Sungai Asam
 Buang Tekurok
 Sengkirap (formerly part of Buang Tekurok)
 Lumapas 'A'
 Lumapas 'B'
 Pancur
 Kilugus

Mentiri Mukim 

 Tanah Jambu
 Sungai Buloh
 Batu Marang
 Panchor
 Mengkubau
 Mentiri

Pangkalan Batu Mukim 

 Kampong Batang Perhentian
 Kampong Batong
 Kampong Batu Ampar
 Kampong Bebatik
 Kampong Bebuloh
 Kampong Bukit Belimbing
 Kampong Imang
 Kampong Junjongan
 Kampong Kuala Lurah
 Kampong Limau Manis
 Kampong Masin
 Kampong Panchor Murai
 Kampong Parit
 Kampong Pengkalan Batu
 Kampong Wasan

Peramu Mukim 

 Bakut Berumput
 Bakut Siraja Muda 'A'
 Bakut Siraja Muda 'B'
 Lurong Sikuna
 Pekilong Muara
 Peramu
 Setia Pahlawan Lama
 Saba Mukim
 Saba Darat 'A'
 Saba Darat 'B'
 Saba Laut
 Saba Tengah
 Saba Ujong

Sengkurong Mukim 

 Kampong Jerudong
 Kampong Katimahar
 Kampong Kulapis
 Kampong Lugu
 Kampong Mulaut
 Kampong Pasai
 Kampong Selayun
 two sub-areas of Kampong Sengkurong:
 Kampong Sengkurong 'A'
 Kampong Sengkurong 'B'
 Kampong Tagap
 Kampong Tanjong Nangka

Serasa Mukim 

 Kapok,
 Meragang,
 Muara,
 Pelumpong,
 Sabun
 Serasa.

Sungai Kebun Mukim 

 Kampong Bolkiah 'A'
 Kampong Bolkiah 'B'
 Kampong Setia 'A'
 Kampong Setia 'B'
 Kampong Sungai Siamas
 Kampong Ujong Kelinik
 Kampong Sungai Kebun

Sungai Kedayan 

 Kampong Sumbiling Lama (Ayer)
 Kampong Bukit Salat
 Kampong Sungai Kedayan 'B'
 Kampong Sungai Kedayan 'A'
 Kampong Ujong Tanjong
 Kampong Kuala Peminyak
 Kampong Pemancha lama

Tamoi Mukim 

 Pengiran Bendahara Lama
 Pengiran Kerma Indera Lama
 Pengiran Tajuddin Hitam
 Tamoi Tengah
 Tamoi Ujong

Temburong District

Amo Mukim 

 Amo 'A'
 Amo 'B'
 Amo 'C'
 Batang Duri
 Belaban
 Biang
 Parit
 Selangan
 Sibulu
 Sibut
 Sumbiling Lama
 Sumbiling Baru

Bangar Mukim 

 Pekan Bangar Lama
 Pekan Bangar Baru
 Perkemahan Bangar
 Kampong Menengah
 Kampong Sungai Sulok
 Kampong Sungai Tanit
 Kampong Sungai Tanam
 Kampong Balayang
 Kampong Semamang
 Kampong Buang Bulan
 Kampong Belingus
 Kampong Batang Tuau
 Kampong Seri Tanjong Belayang
 Kampong Puni
 Kampong Ujong Jalan

Batu Apoi Mukim 

 Kampong Batu Apoi
 Kampong Sungai Radang
 Kampong Peliunan
 Kampong Sungai Bantaian
 Kampong Gadong Baru
 Kampong Luagan
 Kampong Negalang Iring
 Kampong Negalang Unat
 Kampong Lakiun
 Kampong Tanjong Bungar
 Kampong Lamaling
 Kampong Selapon
 Kampong Sekurop

Bokok Mukim 

 Kampong Buda-Buda
 Kampong Belais
 Kampong Belais Kecil
 Kampong Paya Bagangan
 Kampong Bokok
 Kampong Meniup
 Kampong Bakarut
 Kampong Simbatang
 Kampong Rataie
 Kampong Perpindahan Rataie
 Kampong Rakyat Jati
 Kampong Kenua
 Kampong Lepong Baru
 Kampong Lepong Lama
 Kampong Semabat Bahagia
 Kampong Semabat
 Kampong Temada

Labu Mukim 

 Kampong Labu Estate
 Kampong Senukoh
 Kampong Piasau-Piasau
 Kampong Payau
 Kampong Ayam-Ayam

Tutong District

Keriam Mukim 

 Bukit Panggal
 Ikas
 Keriam
 Kupang
 Luagan Dudok
 Maraburong
 Sinaut
 Sungai Kelugos

Kiudang Mukim 

 Kampong Bakiau
 Kampong Batang Mitus
 Kampong Birau
 Kampong Kebia
 Kampong Kiudang
 Kampong Luagan Timbaran
 Kampong Mungkom
 Kampong Pad Nunok
 Kampong Pangkalan Mau

Lamunin Mukim 

 Bintudoh
 Biong
 Bukit Bang Dalam
 Bukit Barun
 Bukit Sulang
 Kuala Abang
 Lamunin
 Layong
 Menengah
 Panchong

Pekan Tutong Mukim 

 Bukit Bendera
 Kandang
 Kuala Tutong
 Panchor Dulit
 Panchor Papan
 Paya Pekan Tutong
 Penabai
 Penanjong
 Petani
 Sengkarai
 Serambangun
 Tanah Burok
 Tutong Kem

Rambai Mukim 

 Kampong Rambai
 Kampong Merimbun
 Kampong Kuala Ungar
 Kampong Benutan
 Kampong Batang Piton
 Kampong Sengkowang
 Kampong Pelajau
 Kampong Kerancing
 Kampong Belaban
 Kampong Mapol
 Kampong Supon Besar
 Kampong Supon Kecil
 Kampong Takalit
 Kampong Lalipo
 Kampong Bedawan
 Kampong Belabau

Tanjong Maya Mukim 

 Bangunggos
 Bukit Sibut
 Bukit Udal
 Liulon
 Lubok Pulau
 Padang
 Pemadang
 Penapar
 Sebakit
 Tanjong Maya
 Tanjong Panjang

Telisai Mukim 

 Binchaya
 Bukit Beruang
 Bukit Pasir
 Danau
 Keramut
 Penapar Danau
 Pengkalan Dalai
 Penyatang
 Sungai Paku
 Telamba
 Telisai
 Tumpuan Ugas

Ukong Mukim 

 Kampong Ukong
 Kampong Pengkalan Ran
 Kampong Pengkalan Dong
 Kampong Tong Kundai
 Kampong Nong Anggeh
 Kampong Sungai Damit Ulu
 Kampong Piton nambang
 Kampong Bang Pangan
 Kampong Pak Meligai
 Kampong Pak Bidang
 Kampong Bukit
 Kampong Pengkalan Panchor
 Kampong Talat
 Kampong Melaboi
 Kampong Pengkalan Padang
 Kampong Bang Ligi
 Kampong Litad
 Kampong Bang Bingol
 Kampong Long Mayan

References

Populated places in Brunei
Villages of Brunei